Monika Beer (born 27 November 1968) is a Swiss gymnast. She competed in six events at the 1984 Summer Olympics.

References

External links
 

1968 births
Living people
Swiss female artistic gymnasts
Olympic gymnasts of Switzerland
Gymnasts at the 1984 Summer Olympics
Place of birth missing (living people)